The 1975 Purdue Boilermakers football team represented Purdue University in the 1975 Big Ten Conference football season. Led by third-year head coach Alex Agase, the Boilermakers compiled an overall record of 4–7 with a mark of 4–4 in conference play, placing in a three-way tie for third in the Big Ten. Purdue played home games at Ross–Ade Stadium in West Lafayette, Indiana.

Schedule

Roster

Starters
Offense: se Arnold, ot Stapleton, og Gibson, c Polak, sg Zelencik, st Long, te Wirgowski, qb Vitali, fl Beery, fb Pruitt, tb Dierking, k Schmidt

Defense: le Smith, lt Novak, mg Gorgal/Ruwe, rt Parker, re Hardy, lb Sullivan, lb Mannella, cb DiMarzio/Harris, cb Cooper, s Wood/Lewis, s Andres/Thompson, p Vitali

Coaching staff

HC: Alex Agase

Ast: George Catavolos, Fred Conti, Jack Ellis, Bob Geiger, Jerry Hartman, Pat Naughton, Tom Roggeman, Rick Venturi, Mike Wynn

Game summaries

Northwestern

Notre Dame

USC
 Paul Beery 6 receptions, 101 yards

Miami (OH)

Wisconsin
 Mike Pruitt 31 carries, 162 yards
 Scott Dierking 20 carries, 139 yards

Illinois
 Mike Pruitt 29 carries, 115 yards

Ohio State

 Mike Pruitt 24 carries, 127 yards

Michigan State
 Scott Dierking 24 carries, 149 yards
 Mike Pruitt 28 carries, 120 yards

Michigan

Iowa

    
    
    
    
    
    

 Scott Dierking 30 carries, 107 yards

Indiana

References

Purdue
Purdue Boilermakers football seasons
Purdue Boilermakers football